Christ Embassy (also known as LoveWorld Incorporated or Believers' Loveworld) is a megachurch and Christian denomination founded by Pastor Chris Oyakhilome in 1987. The Church, with the headquarters in Lagos, Nigeria, has since become a global network of churches, with congregations in many countries and has approximately 4,000,000,000.0
 followers all over the world. The Church has ministries in Canada, Nigeria, South Africa, the United States and the United Kingdom. The church has 145 branches, in five continents.

History 
The church started with a prayer group led by Chris Oyakhilome, at Ambrose Alli University, Ekpoma, while he was studying architecture in 1987. The church celebrated its 30th anniversary in November 2017.

The church has approximately 4,000,000,000 followers worldwide. Several other ministries around the world participate in its programs and conferences like the International Pastors and Partners Conference (IPPC) which holds every November in Lagos, Nigeria; the International Cell Leaders' Conference (ICLC) which holds in the middle of the year; the International School of Ministry; the Healing School, etc.

United Kingdom
Christ Embassy is a registered charity in the United Kingdom, established in 1996. In July 2013 the Charity Commission launched an inquiry regarding the use of charitable funds; however, inspections of records did not resolve concerns about its financial management and in August 2014 the Charity Commission appointed an interim manager to run the charity until 2016. British tax authorities withheld £2.8 million in Gift Aid tax refunds from the charity as they were concerned not all of the charity's income was being spent for charitable purposes.

Canada 
There are over 50 branches of Christ Embassy churches growing in Canada.

Australia 
A branch of the Christ Embassy Church in Sydney was ordered to close for seven days in August 2021 after an illegal in-person service was conducted there during a COVID-19 lockdown. The service was attended by 60 people. The pastor of the church had previously discouraged his followers from receiving COVID-19 vaccines.

LoveWorld television stations
Christ Embassy runs seven TV channels including LoveWorld TV, LoveWorld SAT, LoveWorld Plus, LoveWorld UK, LoveWorld Nigeria, LoveWorld India and LoveWorld USA. LoveWorld USA is run in partnership with Pastor Benny Hinn, who appears in many programs on the channel.

Loveworld Publications 
The publishing house, Loveworld Publications, affiliated to the network of churches, published his first book in 1995, Recreating Your World. Loveworld Publications has published all the books by Chris Oyakhilome, including Rhapsody of Realities daily devotional published in over 5500 languages and in 242 countries and territories of the world. Over 22 billion copies of the devotional have been distributed since it was first published in year 2001.

Christ Embassy also has a book publishing firm called LoveWorld Publishing Ministry and is a dedicated Christian Book Publishing firm reaching out to the world with the gospel of Jesus Christ with God's Word through books authored by Pastor Chris Oyakhilome.

See also 
Loveworld Records
LoveWorld USA
Rozey

References

External links 

Ogun State
Christian denominations in Nigeria
Charismatic denominations
Evangelical megachurches in Nigeria